A nap is a short period of sleep, typically taken during daytime hours as an adjunct to the usual nocturnal sleep period. Naps are most often taken as a response to drowsiness during waking hours. A nap is a form of biphasic or polyphasic sleep, where the latter terms also include longer periods of sleep in addition to one period. For years, scientists have been investigating the benefits of napping, including the 30-minute nap as well as sleep durations of 1–2 hours. Performance across a wide range of cognitive processes has been tested.

Benefits
Sara Mednick conducted a study experimenting on the effects of napping, caffeine, and a placebo. Her results showed that a 60–90-minute nap is more effective than caffeine in memory and cognition.

Power nap

A power nap, also known as a Stage 2 nap, is a short slumber of 20 minutes or less which terminates before the occurrence of deep slow-wave sleep, intended to quickly revitalize the napper. The power nap is meant to maximize the benefits of sleep versus time. It is used to supplement normal sleep, especially when a sleeper has accumulated a sleep deficit. The greater the sleep deficit, however, the effective the nap.

Prescribed napping for sleep disorders
It has been shown that excessive daytime sleepiness (EDS) can be improved by prescribed napping in narcolepsy. Apart from narcolepsy, it has not been demonstrated that naps are beneficial for EDS in other sleep disorders.

Learning and Memory 
Research suggests that shorter, habitual naps after instruction offer the most benefits to learning. The benefits to alertness show no change based on duration of the nap for combating post-lunch dip, even for naps as short as 10 minutes. Napping enhances alertness in young adults and adolescents during afternoons’ performances, which affect efficiency. Additionally, pre-teens who nap regularly during the day demonstrate better sleep at night. In younger children, napping increased drowsiness even while improving memory recall.

For students of all ages, napping during the school day showed benefits to reaction time and recall of declarative memory of new information, especially if the naps remain in slow-wave sleep, i.e. less than an hour in length.

Alertness and Fatigue 
The circadian cycle plays a role in the rising demand for day time naps: sleepiness rises towards mid afternoon, hence the best timing for naps is early afternoon (Stampi, 1992; Bertisch as cited in Bilodeau, 2021).  20-30-minute naps are recommended for adults, while young children and elderly people may need longer naps. Research, on the other hand, has shown that the benefits of napping depend on sleep onset and sleep phases rather than time and duration.

Negative effects

Sleep inertia
The state of grogginess, impaired cognition and disorientation experienced when awakening from sleep is known as sleep inertia. This state reduces the speed of cognitive tasks but has no effects on the accuracy of task performance. The effects of sleep inertia rarely last longer than 30 minutes in the absence of prior sleep deprivation.

Potential health risks
A 2016 meta-analysis showed that naps longer than an hour may be associated with an increased risk for cardiovascular disease, diabetes, metabolic syndrome or death. There was no effect of napping for as long as 40  minutes per day, but a sharp increase in risk of disease occurred at longer nap times.

Habitual naps are also an indicator of neurological degradation such as dementia in the elderly, as reduction in brain function causes more sleepiness.

On sleep disorders
For idiopathic hypersomnia, patients typically experience sleep inertia and are unrefreshed after napping.

Best Practices 
How long and when you nap affects sleep inertia and sleep latency: you are more likely to benefit in terms of those two points when you sleep moderately in the afternoon. According to research, the degree to which a person experiences sleep inertia differs in different durations of nap. Because sleep inertia is possibly resulting from awakening from Slow Wave Sleep, it is more likely to happen when one has a longer nap. Sleep inertia is less intense after short naps. Sleep latency is shorter when a nap is taken between 3pm - 5pm compared with a nap taken between 7pm - 9pm.

According to The Sleep Foundation, Psychology Today and  Harvard Health Publishing, these are the best practices for napping:

 Set up a sleep-friendly environment: it is easier to take a nap when the place is dark, quiet and cool. Curtains, eye masks, ear plugs or gentle music will help.
 Understand your physical needs and make yourself comfortable: don’t feel guilty that you are taking a nap and don’t worry about actually falling asleep during nap time. Getting some rest is still helpful!
 Set an alarm: in order to prevent the negative impact of sleep inertia and sleep latency, it’s important to wake up on time.

See also 
 Siesta

References

External links 

 
 

Sleep

sv:Sömn#Tupplur